Golevka is a rural locality (a settlement) in Yacheyskoye Rural Settlement, Ertilsky District, Voronezh Oblast, Russia. The population was 30 as of 2010.

Geography 
Golevka is located 14 km northwest of Ertil (the district's administrative centre) by road. Studyonovka is the nearest rural locality.

References 

Rural localities in Ertilsky District